Steve Grand OBE (born 12 February 1958) is a British computer scientist and roboticist. He was the creator and lead programmer of the Creatures artificial life simulation, which he discussed in his first book Creation: Life and How to Make It, a finalist for the 2001 Aventis Prize for Science Books. He is also an Officer of the Most Excellent Order of the British Empire, which he received in 2000.

Grand's project from 2001 to 2006 was the building of an artificial robot baby orangutan, with the intention of having it learn as a human baby would. This is documented in his book Growing up with Lucy.

Projects
Creatures
One of the best known projects created by Steve Grand is Creatures, an artificial life simulation, which his company Cyberlife released in 1996.

Lucy, the Android
His project from 2001 to 2005 was Lucy, a mechanical baby orangutan. Lucy was an attempt at simulating the mind of a human baby.

Sim-biosis
Grand worked on Sim-biosis, a computer simulation game in which complete artificial creatures could be built from functional, structural units. It is available on SourceForge under the name Simergy.

Grandroids
In February 2011, Grand announced a new project, Grandroids, described as "real 'alien' life forms who can live in a virtual world on your computer".

Bibliography

 Creation: Life and How to Make It (2001) 
 Growing Up with Lucy (2004) 
 What is the Secret of Consciousness? (2014) TEDxOporto presentation

References

External links
 
 Transcript of Steve's keynote speech, "Machines Like Us," given at the Applied Knowledge Research Institute's 2002 Biennial Seminar
 Steve Grand at the Creatures Wiki
 Feature article on Steve Grand's anthropoid orangutan, Lucy
 Steve Grand quotes
 Steve Grand's discussion with Johnjoe McFadden
 Cyberlife Research Limited
 Steve Grand's Machines Like Us interview
 Grandroids: Real artificial life on your PC a project by Steve Grand

Creatures (video game series)
1958 births
Living people
Officers of the Order of the British Empire
British roboticists
Artificial intelligence researchers
English computer scientists
Researchers of artificial life